William Frederick Sapp (August 30, 1856 - March 8, 1917) was an unsuccessful Democratic party candidate for the state of Kansas in the United States House of Representatives elections of 1894.  He was a member of Democratic National Committee from Kansas.

Biography
He was born on August 30, 1856, in Grand Rapids, Michigan, to Rezin Sapp and Margaret E. Ferry. His father was a Methodist minister.

He married Mary E. Wood on October 29, 1885, in Quincy, Illinois. She was the daughter of Daniel Wood and Mary Abernethy.

He was an unsuccessful Democratic party candidate for the state of Kansas in the United States House of Representatives elections of 1894. He was the Kansas Democratic state chair from 1904 to 1906. He was a member  of Democratic National Committee from Kansas in 1912.

He died on March 8, 1917, in Galena, Kansas. He was buried in Oak Hill Cemetery.

References

1856 births
1917 deaths
1894 United States House of Representatives elections
19th-century American politicians
People from Grand Rapids, Michigan
People from Galena, Kansas